Jennifer Robinson (born December 2, 1976) is a Canadian former competitive figure skater. She is a six-time national champion and finished 7th at the 2002 Winter Olympics.

Early  life 
Robinson was born December 2, 1976 in Goderich, Ontario. She is the niece of NHL hockey player Gaston Gingras.

Career 
Robinson won six Canadian national titles. She placed as high as 8th at the World Championships (2000) and as high as 4th at the Four Continents Championships (2002). She won one Grand Prix medal, bronze, at the 1999 Skate Canada International. She finished 7th at the 2002 Olympics and retired from competition in 2004. She then skated with Stars on Ice. Robinson was one of five stunt doubles for the main character, Casey (played by Michelle Trachtenberg) in the Walt Disney Pictures's 2005 film Ice Princess.

On July 31 and August 7, 2004, Robinson made her radio-hosting debut by hosting a Saturday night retro show on CIQB-FM in Barrie, Ontario, under the direction of station program director Darren Stevens. She also hosted a dinner hour news show called First Local for the Simcoe County, Ontario public access Rogers Cable station. Robinson appears occasionally on the sports talk show Off the Record with Michael Landsberg. She was a commentator at the 2010 Winter Olympics in Vancouver, British Columbia for CTV along with Rod Black and Victor Kraatz during the Women's Figure Skating and Ice Dancing competitions.

In October 2010, Robinson was elected to Barrie City Council, representing Ward 8 in the south-central area of the city. She resigned from her position on council in August 2012, citing personal health reasons.

Personal life 
Robinson lives in Oro-Medonte, Ontario.

Robinson married figure skating coach Shane Dennison in September 2002. She gave birth to a girl named Reese McKenna Dennison on February 2, 2010 at the Royal Victoria Hospital in Barrie, Ontario.

Programs

Results
GP: Champions Series / Grand Prix

References

External links

 Her bio from the Rogers Cable access station in Simcoe County
 

1976 births
Canadian female single skaters
Figure skaters at the 2002 Winter Olympics
Living people
Olympic figure skaters of Canada
People from Goderich, Ontario
Sportspeople from Ontario
Barrie city councillors
Women municipal councillors in Canada